The Jersey general election, 2008 was a series of elections that were taking place in two stages in October and November 2008 in Jersey.

Constable elections 
For the first time since 1948 the elections of constables for the twelve parishes of Jersey have been synchronised so that polling, where necessary, will take place on the same day as the senatorial election on 15 October 2008, in accordance with the Connétables (Jersey) Law 2008 (registered 28 March 2008).

At Assemblies of Electors held in nine parishes on 17 September 2008, constables in five parishes were returned unopposed: St Brelade, St Martin, St Ouen, Trinity and St Saviour. The constables of the other parishes declined to stand down to recontest their seats, preferring to serve out their full term so that the provisions of the law will apply to the next mandate from 2011.

St Clement 
Sitting Constable Derek Gray did not seek re-election. Senator Leonard Norman beat Deputy Gerard Baudains and Centenier Edgar Wallis.

St Helier 
Following his 2008 re-election, Simon Crowcroft declared that he would not stand down to fight a second election in ten months, despite speculation that he would fight a senatorial campaign with a view to becoming Chief Minister.

St Lawrence 
Deputy Deidre Mezbourian beat Chef de Police Tim Tindall.

St Mary 
Sitting Constable Ken Le Brun is standing down. Deputy Juliette Gallichan beat former Chef de Police Terry Renouf.

St Peter 
Procureur du Bien Public John Refault beat Deputy Collin Egré.

Senatorial election 
The senatorial election took place on 15 October 2008. The election was island-wide and there were six seats available. At the Assembly of Electors held in Saint Helier on 16 September 2008, 21 candidates were nominated.

Final results are as follows:

Candidates 
Three sitting senators did not seek re-election:
Wendy Kinnard
Frank Walker
Leonard Norman (confirmed June 2008 his intention to stand for Constable of St. Clement)

The following candidates were sitting senators seeking re-election:
Philip Ozouf
Paul Routier
Mike Vibert

The following candidates were sitting deputies seeking who ran in the senatorial election:
Alan Breckon
Sarah Ferguson
Alan Maclean
Peter Troy
Geoff Southern

Candidates declared the following political affiliations:
Deputy Geoff Southern and Trevor Pitman were candidates of the Jersey Democratic Alliance
Nick Le Cornu and Montfort Tadier were members of Time4Change/Reform
Daniel Wimberley, Mark Forskitt, and Nick Palmer are members of Jersey 2020

Deputy elections 
The election for deputies took place on 26 November 2008. Twelve new deputies were elected, five sitting deputies lost their seats and four were reelected without opposition.

St Brelade

St Brelade No. 1

St Brelade No. 2

St Clement

Grouville 
Carolyn Labey won unopposed.

St Helier

St Helier No. 1 
Incumbents Le Claire and Martin were joined by JDA candidate Trevor Pitman, husband of Shona Pitman re-elected in neighbouring St Helier No. 2

Paul Le Claire 634
Judy Martin 601
Trevor Pitman 487

Nick Le Cornu 406
Katy Ringsdore 387
Brian Beadle 229
Chris Whitworth 144

St Helier No. 2 
All three seats taken by JDA candidates; Southern and Pitman as incumbents joined by de Sousa.

Geoff Southern 665
Shona Pitman 598
Debbie de Sousa 444

Rod Bryans 412
Sue Stoker 301
Adrian Walsh 228
Giffard Aubin 100

On 20 February 2009 Geoff Southern and Shona Pitman pleaded guilty in the Magistrate's Court to charges of contravening the Public Elections Law with respect to irregularities in postal voting procedure, and were referred to the Royal Court for sentencing. They have also faced calls to annul the result of the election.

St Helier No.3/4
A recount to decide fourth place meant that incumbent Fox retained his seat by one vote. Incumbent Hilton topped the poll, but incumbent Huet lost her seat and incumbent de Faye, outgoing Minister for Transport and Technical services, was heavily defeated.

Jackie Hilton 1259
Mike Higgins 1193
Andrew Green 1057
Ben Fox 698

Suzette Hase 697
Jacqui Huet 645
Steve Beddoe 627
David Beuzeval 587
Guy de Faye 359
Gil Blackwood 340
Colin Russell 308

St John
Ryan, an incumbent in St Helier No. 1, stood in his parish of residence but was defeated by Rondel who had been Deputy for St John before standing down in 2005

Phil Rondel 678

Patrick Ryan 396

St Lawrence
Incumbent Le Fondré topped the poll.

John Le Fondré 918
Edward Noel 518

Hugh Gill 462
Nick Palmer 274

St Martin
Incumbent Hill returned.

Bob Hill 832

Martin Greene 275

St Mary
Daniel Wimberley 261

Robert David Johnson 206
David Richardson 28

St Ouen
James Reed (Unopposed)

St Peter
Incumbent Egré returned.

Colin Egré 731

Julie Rabet 664

St Saviour

St Saviour No. 1
Incumbent Duhamel topped the poll, but incumbent Scott Warren was defeated. 21-year-old Maçon became the youngest States Member ever elected.

Rob Duhamel 569
Jeremy Maçon 448

Tony Nightingale 424
Celia Scott Warren 388

St Saviour No. 2 
Incumbent Lewis re-elected.

Kevin Lewis 509
Tracey Vallois 277

Glen George 260
Christine Papworth 198
Cliff Le Clercq 129

St Saviour No. 3 
Roy Le Herissier (Unopposed)

Trinity
Deputy Anne Pryke (Unopposed)

CET referendum 
A referendum on the question "Do you think that Jersey should adopt Central European Time?" was put to voters on 15 October.

Voting age reduced 
The 2008 general election is the first in which 16- and 17-year-old voters will take part, following a law to reduce voting age to 16. The law was brought into force on 12 March 2008 and became effective on 1 April 2008.

References

External links 
Electoral registration at vote.je

2008 elections in Europe
Election
General 2008
2008 referendums
Referendums in Jersey
October 2008 events in Europe
November 2008 events in Europe